Barry E. Blitzer (April 21, 1929 – January 27, 2010) was an American television writer.

Life and career
Blitzer was well known as a writer for the Hanna-Barbera cartoons including The Flintstones, Top Cat, and The Jetsons.

Listed as the last surviving member of a group of writers that won a 1956 Best Comedy Writing Emmy, the award was given for his work on the show The Phil Silvers Show and the episode was "You’ll Never Get Rich".

He worked on 1970s children's TV show Land of the Lost and the 1960s comedy series Get Smart along with writing stints on The Love Boat, Too Close for Comfort, McHale's Navy and Good Times.

Honors
Blitzer was part of a group of writers that won a 1956 Primetime Emmy Award for Best Comedy writing. He also was nominated for a Writers Guild award for his work on Get Smart.

Death
Blitzer died on January 27, 2010, at the age of 80 from complications after abdominal surgery.

References

External links

1929 births
2010 deaths
American television writers
American male television writers
Emmy Award winners
Writers from New York City
Screenwriters from New York (state)